Psyence a Go Go is a live album by hide, released on March 19, 2008. It contains a full-length concert, from his 1996 tour of the same name, recorded on October 20, 1996, at the Yoyogi National Gymnasium. The album reached number 18 on the Oricon chart.

Track listing

References

2008 live albums
Hide (musician) albums